Kieran Neil Wallace (born 26 January 1995) is an English footballer who plays as a defender for Mansfield Town.

Club career

Nottingham Forest 

Wallace started his career with Nottingham Forest before joining Ilkeston in summer 2014 on a non-contract basis.

Sheffield United 

On 28 November 2014, Sheffield United completed the signing of Wallace on a deal until the end of the season. He made his debut on 13 December 2014 away at Fleetwood Town in a 1–1 draw. On 26 March 2015, Wallace joined Lincoln City on loan until the end of the season.

At the end of the 2014–2015 season "The Blades" opted to extend their right to a further year on the contract for Wallace. During the pre-season, new manager Nigel Adkins played Wallace primarily at centre half, as opposed to his more customary midfield role. Adkins commented on how well Wallace was impressing in the new role and indeed Wallace has appeared regularly at the beginning of the season, again in a new defensive position, this time at left back. After spending the majority of the 2016–17 season on loan at Fleetwood Town, his contract with the Blades was terminated by mutual consent on 16 August 2017.

Matlock Town

Kieran joined Matlock Town.

Burton Albion
He joined Burton Albion in October 2018. In 2020 he signed a new contract with the club, one of a number of players taking a pay cut in the process in order to do so.

Wallace suffered a torn ACL during the 2020/21 season, ruling him out until the summer of 2021.

On 19 November 2021, he joined York City on loan until 3 January 2022.

Mansfield Town
On 28 January 2022, Wallace joined Mansfield Town on a free transfer on a contract until the end of the season.

International career

Wallace has represented England Under-17s at international level.

Career statistics

References

External links

England profile at the FA

1995 births
Living people
Footballers from Nottingham
English footballers
Association football midfielders
Nottingham Forest F.C. players
Ilkeston F.C. players
Sheffield United F.C. players
Lincoln City F.C. players
Fleetwood Town F.C. players
Matlock Town F.C. players
Burton Albion F.C. players
York City F.C. players
Mansfield Town F.C. players
Northern Premier League players
English Football League players
National League (English football) players